The 1961 Argentine Primera División was the 70th season of top-flight football in Argentina. The season began on April 16 and ended on December 3.

Racing Club won its 14th championship while two teams were relegated to Primera B, Lanús and Los Andes.

League standings

References

Argentine Primera División seasons
Argentine Primera Division
1